Allel Boukhalfa (17 February 1988) is a Paralympic athlete from Algeria. Boukhalfa represented his country twice at the Summer Paralympic Games, in 2008 in Beijing and 2012 in London.

He is the current world record holder in the T35 400m with a performance of 60.55 which he set in Christchurch, New Zealand on the 29 January 2011, set while winning gold at the 2011 IPC Athletics World Championships. He also finished second in the T35 200m at the same championships.

References

Living people
Athletes (track and field) at the 2008 Summer Paralympics
Athletes (track and field) at the 2012 Summer Paralympics
Paralympic athletes of Algeria
World record holders in Paralympic athletics
1988 births
Track and field athletes with cerebral palsy
Algerian male sprinters
Algerian people with disabilities
21st-century Algerian people